Sports Club Victoria University  (SCVU) is a Ugandan football club, based in Kampala. They play their home games at the Mandela National Stadium.

History
SCVU was formed on 19 August 2011, and played in the Uganda Big League, winning the play-off final 4-0 against Aurum Roses to gain promotion to the Uganda Premier League. First Head Coach in history of SC Victoria University was Serbian tactician Ivan Zoric. Following the promotion of Sports Club Victoria University (SCVU) to the Uganda Super League in 2012, SCVU finished fifth in the 2012-13 season and won its first major trophy, the Uganda Cup in 2013. SCVU played in the 2014 CAF Confederation Cup, losing to CS Don Bosco in the first round. 

In 2014 Uganda Cup, SCVU was knocked out at the semifinals round by KCC FC by an aggregate score of 2-1, goals all after the second leg at Namboole which ended in a goalless draw.

Achievements
Ugandan Cup
Winner (1 time): 2013
Ugandan Super Cup
Runner-up (1 time): 2013

References

External links
 Official website

Sport in Kampala
Football clubs in Uganda
University and college association football clubs